Adrian Angelico (born 9 March 1979) is a Norwegian-Sámi operatic mezzo-soprano. He is a trans male singer active on the opera scene.

Biography
Adrian Angelico was born Angelica Voje in Tromsø and raised in Grorud Valley, Oslo.

He took part in the 2009 Oslo Grieg Festival.

He debuted at the London Royal Opera House in June 2014, as Marquise de Merteuil in John Fulljames's production of Luca Francesconi's opera Quartett.

Reference

External links
 

1979 births
Living people
Norwegian operatic mezzo-sopranos
Norwegian LGBT singers
Norwegian transgender people
LGBT classical musicians
21st-century Norwegian opera singers
Norwegian Sámi musicians
Transgender male musicians
LGBT Sámi people